MV Agios Georgios, also known as MV Panagia Tinou, was a historic roll on roll off ferry launched in 1972 as MV Hengist. She was designed to operate across the English channel and served the Folkestone-Boulogne route until 1991. In 1987, she was beached as a result of the great storm of 1987.  She served with several operators before being sold to Vaggelis Ventouris in 2004 to serve the Greek islands.

In April 2016, she sank while docked in Piraeus. The ship was refloated in February 2017 and was scrapped in the same year.

References

 

1972 ships
Ships built in France
Ships of British Rail
Ships of the Stena Line
Ferries of Greece
Maritime incidents in 1987
Maritime incidents in 2016